The Rally China (中国拉力赛) is the largest rally racing event held in China. The first event was run as the China Rally in 1997 in the province of Guangdong, as a replacement to the Hong Kong - Beijing Rally, and was an event on the World Rally Championship (WRC) calendar in 1999. However it was replaced by the Cyprus Rally the following year. From 2000 to 2015, it has been part of the Asia Pacific Rally Championship (APRC), moving initially to Shaoguan, Guangdong province. "Force majeure because of government", according to the organisers, led to the cancellation of the event in 2003. The event moved for a single year to Huizhou, Guangdong in 2004 before reverting to Shaoguan. From 2009 until 2015, the event was hosted in Longyou, Zhejiang province. The event returned to the WRC calendar in 2016 after moving to Huairou, Beijing, but was cancelled due to weather damage. China will continue to host a round of the Asia-Pacific Rally Championship in Zhangye, Gansu in 2016 too, while Longyou will continue to host a round of the Chinese Rally Championship.

List of previous winners

Rally China

References

Rally competitions in China
China
China
Recurring sporting events established in 1997
Recurring sporting events disestablished in 2016
China